Eupithecia naumanni is a moth in the family Geometridae first described by Vladimir G. Mironov and Ulrich Ratzel in 2012. It is found in eastern Afghanistan.

The wingspan is 20.5–25 mm. The forewings and hindwings are brownish grey.

Etymology
The species is named in honour of the German zoologist and lepidopterologist Prof. Dr. Clas Naumann, the former director of the Zoologisches Forschungsinstitut und Museum Alexander Koenig in Bonn, Germany.

References

Moths described in 2012
naumanni
Moths of Asia